Compact Disc recordings contain two channels of 44.1-kHz 16-bit linear PCM audio. However, creators of the CD originally contemplated a four-channel, or quadraphonic, mode as well.

The proprietary Red Book specification, as published by Sony and Philips, briefly mentions a four-channel mode in its June 1980, September 1983, and November 1991 editions. On the first page, it lays out the "Main parameters" of the CD system, including: "Number of channels: 2 and/or 4 simultaneously[*] sampled." The footnote says, "In the case of more than two channels the encoder and decoder diagrams have to be adapted."

The Red Book also reserved the first bit of the so-called Q subchannel "control field" to signal the presence of four-channel audio, but did not specify a method for using four-channel in the CD system. Had it been later specified, this mode might have included four separate channels of linear PCM audio (requiring some combination of faster rotation, a lower sampling rate, fewer bits per sample, or compression). Alternatively, the "four-channel" bit could have been used merely to indicate the presence of a matrix-encoded recording, for example Dolby Pro Logic.

In reality, however, the underspecified "four-channel" mode was dropped from the CD standard when it was adopted by the International Electrotechnical Commission and became IEC 908:1987, and later IEC 60908:1999. (Various national authorities have also adopted the IEC standard. E.g., it is also European Standard EN 60908:1999.)

Neither the 1987 nor the 1999 version of the IEC standard discusses the possibility of four-channel audio. Instead, the IEC document reserves the first bit of the Q subchannel "control field" to a different, although similarly cryptic, purpose—according to clause 17.5 note 2, it is for "Broadcasting use" in "non-audio applications of the Compact Disc."

Since the behavior of the "four-channel" or "Broadcasting use" bit was never specified by either CD standard, no mass-marketed discs have attempted to use the Red Book's four-channel mode, and no players have purported to implement it.

See also 
 Multitrack recording
 Super Audio CD
 Surround sound
 5.1 Music Disc

References

External links 
 Apple discourages use of four-channel flag

Audio storage
Compact disc
Japanese inventions
Quadraphonic sound